Anthiinae is a subfamily of beetles in the family Carabidae, containing the following genera:

 Aenigma Newman, 1836
 Ametroglossus Sloane, 1914
 Anguloderus Anichtchenko & Sciaky, 2017
 Anthia Weber, 1801
 Atractonotus Perroud, 1847
 Baeoglossa Chaudoir, 1850
 Colfax Andrewes, 1920
 Creagris Nietner, 1857
 Cycloloba Chaudoir, 1850
 Cypholoba Chaudoir, 1850
 Dailodontus Reiche, 1843
 Dicranoglossus Chaudoir, 1872
 Eccoptoptera Chaudoir, 1878
 Epimicodema Sloane, 1914
 Erephognathus Alluaud, 1932
 Foveocrotaphus Anichtchenko, 2014
 Gigadema J.Thomson, 1859
 Gonogenia Chaudoir, 1844
 Helluapterus Sloane, 1914
 Helluarchus Sloane, 1914
 Helluo Bonelli, 1813
 Helluobrochus Reichardt, 1974
 Helluodema Castelnau, 1867
 Helluodes Westwood, 1847
 Helluomorpha Laporte, 1834
 Helluomorphoides Ball, 1951
 Helluonidius Chaudoir, 1872
 Helluopapua Darlington, 1968
 Helluosoma Laporte, 1867
 Holoponerus Fairmaire, 1883
 Macrocheilus Hope, 1838
 Meladroma Motschulsky, 1855
 Neohelluo Sloane, 1914
 Netrodera Chaudoir, 1850
 Omphra Dejean, 1825
 Physocrotaphus Parry, 1849
 Physoglossus Akhil & Sabu, 2020
 Platyhelluo Baehr, 2005
 Pleuracanthus Gray, 1832
 Pogonoglossus Chaudoir, 1863
 Schuelea Baehr, 2004
 Triaenogenius Chaudoir, 1877

References

 
Carabidae subfamilies